Chennur is a census town in Mancherial district of the Indian state of Telangana. located on the banks of Godavari river. Generally Godavari flows from west to east but the Godavari river in Chennur flows towards the north for 5 Kosa (15 km) hence it is known as "Panchkosha Uttara Wahini". and It is a Municipal Council and the headquarters of Chennur  mandal, It is located in Chennur mandal of Mancherial revenue division and Chennur is assembly constituency  .

Civic administration 
Chennur Municipality ,  'Municipal Council Chennur' (MCC) is the civic body that administers the city. it was constituted as a third grade municipality in the year 2018.

Administrative divisions
Chennur Mandal has 30 villages.

Geography 

References 

Villages in Mancherial district
Mandal headquarters in Mancherial district
Census towns in Adilabad district